The Division of Fremantle is an electoral division of the Australian House of Representatives in Western Australia.

Geography
Since 1984, federal electoral division boundaries in Australia have been determined at redistributions by a redistribution committee appointed by the Australian Electoral Commission. Redistributions occur for the boundaries of divisions in a particular state, and they occur every seven years, or sooner if a state's representation entitlement changes or when divisions of a state are malapportioned.

History

The division was created at Federation in 1900 and was one of the original 65 divisions contested at the first federal election. It is named for the city of Fremantle, which in turn is named for Captain Charles Fremantle, captain of HMS Challenger, who took formal possession of the west coast of New Holland in the name of His Majesty the King. This action cleared the way for the arrival of Captain James Stirling and the first party of Swan River Colony settlers a few weeks later.

As originally drawn, the Division of Fremantle included nearly all of Perth's south-of-the-river suburbs, plus the western suburbs south 
from Mt Claremont and Nedlands. On these boundaries, the seat frequently changed hands between the Australian Labor Party and the conservative parties for the first three decades of its existence. However, Labor has held the seat without interruption since 1934, and for all but one term since 1928. The 1949 expansion of Parliament made Fremantle even safer for Labor by shifting most of its northern portion to the newly created Division of Curtin. Since then, it has usually been one of the safest Labor seats in Australia. It was nearly lost in the landslides of 1975 and 1977, but since the 1980 redistribution when the suburbs of Mosman Park, Peppermint Grove and Cottesloe were transferred to the Division of Curtin, the Liberals have only twice garnered 45 percent of the two-party vote, in 1996 and 2013.

In the 2021 redistribution, the electoral boundaries of Fremantle were left unchanged. Consequently, the 2016 boundaries continued to apply as of the 2022 election.

The Division is located in the southern suburbs of Perth. As at the 2022 election, it includes the following suburbs:

City of Cockburn: 

 Atwell
 Aubin Grove
 Banjup
 Beeliar
 Bibra Lake
 Cockburn Central
 Coogee
 Coolbellup
Hamilton Hill
Hammond Park
Henderson
Jandakot
Lake Coogee
Munster
North Coogee
North Lake
South Lake
Spearwood
Success
Treeby
Wattleup
Yangebup

Town of East Fremantle

City of Fremantle: 

 Beaconsfield
 Fremantle
 Hilton
 North Fremantle
 O'Connor
 Samson
 South Fremantle
 White Gum Valley

City of Melville: 

 Palmyra
 Kardinya (part)
 Leeming (Ken Hurst Park)

Rottnest Island 
Since World War II, Fremantle has been held by a succession of senior Labor figures. The seat's best-known member was John Curtin, who was Prime Minister of Australia from 1941 to 1945. Other high-profile members were Kim Beazley Sr., a minister in the Whitlam Government; John Dawkins, a minister in the Hawke and Keating Governments; and Carmen Lawrence, the former Premier of Western Australia and a minister in the Keating Government. Lawrence retired at the 2007 election. She was succeeded by Melissa Parke, a former United Nations lawyer and a minister in the second Rudd Government.

Members

Election results

References

External links
 Division of Fremantle - Australian Electoral Commission

Electoral divisions of Australia
Constituencies established in 1901
1901 establishments in Australia
Federal politics in Western Australia